Anatoly Onishchuk (born 29 August 1946) is a Soviet former sports shooter. He competed in the 25 metre pistol event at the 1968 Summer Olympics.

References

1946 births
Living people
Soviet male sport shooters
Olympic shooters of the Soviet Union
Shooters at the 1968 Summer Olympics
Sportspeople from Smolensk